782 Montefiore is a minor planet orbiting the Sun that was discovered by Austrian astronomer Johann Palisa on 18 March 1914 and named for Clarice Sebag-Montefiore, wife of Alfons von Rothschild of Vienna. The orbital plane of this asteroid is inclined by an angle of 5.26° to the plane of the ecliptic.

10μ radiometric data collected from Kitt Peak in 1975 gave a diameter estimate of 15 km. Photometric light curve studies from 1997 onward give a consistent rotation period of 4.07 hours.

References

External links 
 
 

000782
Discoveries by Johann Palisa
Named minor planets
000782
000782
19140318